ABC1 is the former name of the main television channel from the Australian Broadcasting Corporation in Australia.

ABC1 may also refer to:

 ABC1 (British and Irish TV channel), a defunct British television channel
 U.S.–British Staff Conference (ABC–1), a military plan during World War II
 ABC1, the first half of the NRS social grades used in the United Kingdom to refer to the middle classes with C2DE being the working class

See also
 ABCA1, a protein which in humans is encoded by the ABCA1 gene